Dany Theis (11 September 1967 – 29 December 2022) was a Luxembourgian football player and manager. A midfielder, he made 34 appearances for the Luxembourg national team.

Theis died of complications from a heart attack and a fall on 29 December 2022, at the age of 55.

References

1967 births
2022 deaths
Sportspeople from Esch-sur-Alzette
Luxembourgian footballers
Association football midfielders
Luxembourg international footballers
Jeunesse Esch players
Union Luxembourg players
FC Avenir Beggen players
FC Progrès Niederkorn players
Luxembourgian football managers
FC Differdange 03 managers
F91 Dudelange managers
Jeunesse Esch managers
FC Swift Hesperange managers